Pariser Platz is a square in the historic center of Berlin, Germany, situated by the Brandenburg Gate at the end of the Unter den Linden. The square is named after the French capital of Paris to commemorate the anti-Napoleon Allies' victory at the Battle of Paris (1814), and is one of the main focal points of the city.

History 

Pariser Platz is the square immediately behind the Brandenburg Gate when approaching the historic heart of Berlin from the zoological garden in the west. The Neoclassical Brandenburg Gate was completed in the early 1790s by Carl Gotthard Langhans. Until 1814, the square was known simply as Quarrel or Direct (the Square). In March 1814, after Prussian troops along with the other Allies captured Paris after the overthrow of Napoleon, it was renamed Pariser Platz to mark this triumph.

The Brandenburg Gate was the main gate in the western side of the Customs Wall that surrounded the city in the eighteenth century. In fact, the Pariser Platz is located at the western end of Unter den Linden, the ceremonial axis of the city, down which the victorious troops of all regimes ranging from the Hohenzollern's to the German Democratic Republic have marched in triumph.

Before World War II, Pariser Platz was the grandest square in Berlin, surrounded by the American and French embassies, the finest hotel (the Adlon Hotel), the Academy of the Arts, and several blocks of apartments and offices.

During the last years of World War II, all the buildings around the square were turned to rubble by air raids and heavy artillery bombardment. The only structure left standing in the ruins of Pariser Platz was the Brandenburg Gate, which was restored by the East Berlin and West Berlin governments. After the war and especially with the construction of the Berlin Wall, the square was laid waste and became part of the death zone dividing the city.

When the city was reunited in 1990, there was broad consensus that the Pariser Platz should be made into a fine urban space again. The embassies would move back, the hotel and arts academy would be reinstated, and prestigious firms would be encouraged to build round the square. Under the rules of reconstruction, eaves heights had to be 22 meters, and buildings had to have a proper termination against the sky. Stone cladding was to be used as far as possible. Interpretations of these constraints, however, have varied to a great extent.

Buildings on Pariser Platz
The following is a partial list of buildings and structures on Pariser Platz, working anti clockwise from the Brandenburg Gate:

 Brandenburg Gate
 Haus Sommer, used by Commerzbank
 U.S. Embassy
 Palais Wrangel, used by DZ Bank
 Academy of Arts, Berlin
 Brandenburg Gate Museum
 Hotel Adlon
 French Embassy
 Eugen-Gutmann-Haus, used by Dresdner Bank
 Palais am Pariser Platz
 Haus Liebermann

In the vicinity of Pariser Platz are: 
North: Reichstag building and government district 
South: Memorial to the Murdered Jews of Europe 
Southeast: British Embassy at Wilhelmstrasse
East: Embassies of Russia and Hungary at Unter den Linden

Notable residents 
 Achim von Arnim, poet and novelist
 August von Kotzebue, dramatist
 Max Liebermann, painter
 Giacomo Meyerbeer, composer
 Friedrich Carl von Savigny, jurist (Historical School)
 Albert Speer, architect, Nazi minister for armaments
 Friedrich von Wrangel, Prussian Generalfeldmarschall

Transport
Near the square is located the Brandenburger Tor underground station which is served by the Berlin S-Bahn S1 line, and is a station on Berlin U-Bahn line U5. The S-Bahn station was opened in 1936 with the name Unter den Linden and was closed in 1961 with the construction of the Berlin Wall, becoming one of Berlin's ghost stations. It reopened on September 1, 1990.

The square itself is closed to automobile traffic, but is served by local bus lines nearby.

References 
In Pariser Platz - design and construction of town square in Berlin, Germany, by Anne Vyne, in The Architectural Review, No. 1, 1999.

External links

 Pariser Platz - Interactive 360° Panorama

Squares in Berlin
Buildings and structures in Mitte
National squares
Rebuilt buildings and structures in Berlin